Huntington Center may refer to a location in the United States:

Huntington Center, a shopping center in Huntington Beach, California, now known as Bella Terra
Huntington Center (Columbus, Ohio), an office building complex in Columbus, Ohio
Huntington Center (Toledo, Ohio), formerly known as the Lucas County Arena, an indoor sports arena in Toledo, Ohio
Huntington Center, Vermont, a village in the town of Huntington